Predojević is a Serbo-Croatian surname, a patronymic derived from the Old Serbian name Predoje. It is traditionally found in Herzegovina, borne by ethnic Serbs. The surname is found in Serbs in Ervenik, Croatia. It may refer to:

Borki Predojević (b. 1987), Bosnian chess Grandmaster
Draženko Predojević, Bosnian Serb acquitted war crime indictee (Army of Republika Srpska)
Telli Hasan Pasha (Hasan-paša Predojević, d. 1593), Ottoman Bosnian military commander
Gabrijel Predojević, Bishop of Marča 1642–1644
Maksim Predojević, Bishop of Marča 1630–1642
Matthias Predojević (born 1976), German-Croatian footballer
Nemanja Predojević, Serbian TV actor (Potpisani)
Vasilije Predojević, Bishop of Marča 1644–1648
Vladimir Predojević, Serbian icon painter (St. Michael's Cathedral)
Srđan Predojević, Serbian TV-host (RTV Pink)

See also
Predojević church, ruins of a 16th-century church in Plana, Bosnia and Herzegovina
Predović, surname
Predić, surname

References

Sources

Serbian surnames
Bosnian surnames